Farnley is a property that includes two historic plantation houses   and a farm located near White Post, Clarke County, Virginia. The Meadows is a brick I-house built sometime between 1815 and 1820. The focal point of the property, however, is its namesake Farnley, a sophisticated Federal-style residence built about 1836. It has a gable roof with wide interior-end chimneys.  Also on the property is an assortment of 19th- and 20th-century farm buildings including a stone slave quarters.

It was listed on the National Register of Historic Places in 1989.

References

Plantation houses in Virginia
Houses on the National Register of Historic Places in Virginia
Farms on the National Register of Historic Places in Virginia
National Register of Historic Places in Clarke County, Virginia
Federal architecture in Virginia
Houses completed in 1820
Houses completed in 1836
Houses in Clarke County, Virginia
Slave cabins and quarters in the United States